This is a list of the football (soccer) events of the year 1989 throughout the world.

Events
March 3 – Portugal wins its first FIFA World Youth Championship
April 15 – Hillsborough disaster, that occurred at Hillsborough, before the FA Cup Semi-Final between Liverpool & Nottingham Forest.
May 20 – Liverpool wins the FA Cup, beating Everton 3–2 AET, thanks to two goals from Ian Rush.
May 24 – A.C. Milan defeats Steaua București, 4–0, to win their third European Cup final.
May 26 – Arsenal beat Liverpool F.C. 2–0 at Anfield to dramatically win the English Football League First Division, thanks to an injury time goal from Michael Thomas.
May 31 – Copa Libertadores is won by Atlético Nacional after defeating Olimpia Asunción 5–4 on penalties after a final aggregate score of 2–2.
June 24 – In the final of the FIFA U-16 World Championship, Saudi Arabia became surprising winners during the penalty shoot-out to Scotland in Glasgow.
December 17 – Italy's Milan wins the Intercontinental Cup in Tokyo, Japan by defeating Colombia's Atlético Nacional in extra-time 1–0. The only goal is scored by Alberigo Evani.

Winners club national championships

Africa

Asia

Europe

North America

Oceania

South America

International Tournaments 
 Copa América in Brazil (July 1–16, 1989)

National Teams



Births

January
 January 6: Jasmin Pllana, Austrian club footballer
 January 7: 
Emiliano Insúa (Argentinian defender)
Miles Addison (English defender)
Khairul Fahmi Che Mat, Malaysian footballer
 January 14: 
Adam Clayton (English youth international)
Mattia Marchi (Italian club footballer)
Liu Xiaodong (Chinese footballer)
 January 20: Washington Santana da Silva, Brazilian club footballer
 January 29: Dirceu (Brazilian footballer)
 January 30: Tomás Mejías (Spanish youth international)

February
 February 1: Oleksandr Protsyuk (Ukrainian footballer)
 February 14: Jocenir "Jocenir Alves da Silva" (Brazilian footballer)
 February 21: Luca Borrelli (Italian professional footballer)

March
 March 1: Carlos Vela (Mexican forward)
 March 7: Mario Villanueva (Belizean defender)
 March 13: Marko Marin (German international midfielder)
 March 15: Ondřej Mazuch (Czech defender)
 March 16: Theo Walcott (English international forward)
 March 29: Arnold Peralta Honduran international footballer (died 2015)
 March 31: Pablo Piatti (Argentinian forward)

April
 April 20: Michał Pytkowski, Polish footballer
 April 22: Jasper Cillessen, Dutch international goalkeeper
 April 29: Edgar Machuca, Paraguayan footballer

May
 May 6: Chukwuma Akabueze (Nigerian midfielder)
 May 11: Giovani dos Santos (Mexican forward)
 May 31: 
Bas Dost (Dutch footballer)
Marco Reus (German footballer)

June
 June 2: Freddy Adu (American forward)
 June 18: Pierre-Emerick Aubameyang (Gabonese striker)
 June 25: Jack Cork (English footballer)

July
 July 16: Gareth Bale (Welsh international forward)

August
 August 3: Nick Viergever (Dutch defender)
 August 10: Ben Sahar (Israeli forward)
 August 12: Vladimir Castellón (Bolivian forward)
 August 17: David Abdul (Dutch Antillean forward)

September
 September 1: 
 Jefferson Montero, Ecuadorian international
 Daniel Sturridge (English forward)
 September 2: Alexandre Pato (Brazilian forward)
 September 25: Krisztián Brunczvik (Slovak footballer, midfielder)

October
 October 3: Natalia Saratovtseva, former Russian footballer
 October 4: Benjamin Stebbings, English cricketer
 October 6: Albert Ebossé Bodjongo, Cameroonian international footballer (died 2014)
 October 24: 
Armin Bačinović, Slovenian midfielder
Jack Colback, English footballer
 Cristian Gamboa, Costa Rican international
 Igor Pisanjuk, Serbian footballer

November
 November 5: 
Andrew Boyce, English club footballer
Mabiala Brandon, French footballer
 November 6: Josmer Altidore (American forward)
 November 17: Nick Salapatas, British-Greek footballer
 November 22: José Carlos Prieto, Chilean footballer

December
 December 3: Kristjan Lipovac, Slovenian footballer
 December 17: André Ayew, Ghanaian footballer
 December 22: Daniel Goldschmitt, German footballer

Deaths

February
 February 5 – André Cheuva (80), French footballer

April
 April 24 – Franz Binder (77), Austrian footballer

May
 May 19 – Samuel Okwaraji, (25) Nigerian footballer, squad Nigeria national football team at the 1988 Summer Olympics

July
 July 20 – José Augusto Brandão, Brazilian midfielder, semi-finalist at the 1938 FIFA World Cup. (79)

September
 September 1 – Kazimierz Deyna (41), Polish footballer

November
 November 9 – Leen Vente (78), Dutch footballer

References

External links
  Rec.Sport.Soccer Statistics Foundation
  VoetbalStats

 
Association football by year